GURPS High-Tech is a sourcebook published by Steve Jackson Games (SJG) in 1988 for GURPS (Generic Universal Role-Playing System).

Contents
GURPS High-Tech is a GURPS supplement of rules for weapons and transportation, focusing on firearms and organized into seven technological levels, from the black-powder-musket era to a future of lasers and stun guns. The book includes descriptions of standard weapons from all levels. It is a universal sourcebook for GURPS that is intended to be useable in many different settings.

The book is divided into three sections:
. Guns, Projectiles, and Explosives
. Details of the four "tech" levels covered by this book
. A list of individual weapons, costs and availability

Publication history
GURPS High-Tech was written by Michael Hurst, with art by Guy Burchak, and was first published by Steve Jackson Games in 1988 as a 128-page book.

A new GURPS High-Tech (2007) was one of the tech books published for GURPS 4e.

Reception
In the April 1989 edition of Games International (Issue 4), James Wallis questioned the blurb on the back cover of the book, which claimed this book was "A Sourcebook of Weapons & Equipment Through the Ages." Wallis agreed with the "weapons" part of the description, but found equipment "takes a back seat." He did find the book "well-presented and laid out, written in an interesting style which often takes joy in tongue-in-cheek examples of the rules which it explains." He concluded by giving the book an average score of 3.5 out of 5, saying, "It is not essential by any means, but is a nice items for the GURPS referee to own."

Reviews of GURPS High-Tech appeared in two issues of  Dragon:
 In the December 1989 edition (Issue 152), Jim Bambra thought that the book was "a valuable addition to the GURPS system, particularly to GMs running historical or time-travel campaigns. Using these rules, small-scale military actions can easily be staged and have the added bonus of being set in any gunpowder era—modern day, World War II, the American Civil War, the Napoleonic Wars, and the Thirty Years War being just some of the possibilities." Bambra concluded with a thumbs up, "Even you have no interest in the GURPS game system, GURPS High-Tech is still a very useful guide to weaponry and equipment." 
 In the April 1993 edition (Issue 192), Rick Swan described the book as "Packed with lucid descriptions, sharp illustrations, and fascinating trivia (early military engineers not only designed weapons, they also distilled brandy and taught chess), High Tech is a dazzler.

References

GURPS 3rd edition
GURPS 4th edition
High-Tech
Role-playing game supplements introduced in 1988